The Simpson Desert Bike Challenge (SDBC) is an annual staged mountain bike race held in the Simpson Desert of Australia. First held in 1987, the SDBC is run by the non-profit organisation Desert Challenge Inc

The SDBC covers between 500 and 600 kilometres and lasts five days. The times taken to finish each stage are aggregated to determine the overall winner. Although the course changes every year, the SDBC typically starts in South Australia and finishes in Birdsville, Queensland. The route takes riders and support crews through the largest parallel sand dune desert in the world.

Riders of all ages and abilities are allowed to participate. For example, past competitors have included a cop, a coffee shop owner, and an IT manager.

The SDBC is unofficially the world's longest-running mountain bike stage race. According to several endurance event rating sites, the SDBC race is one of the world's toughest endurance events.

There is no prize pool for the SDBC  . All proceeds are donated to charity. Since 2008 the committee has donated the proceeds to the Royal Flying Doctor Service of Australia (RFDS)  Money is raised for the RFDS through online fundraising of riders, a post-race auction, as well as donations collected during the event for (fun) fines. So far more than $312,000 have been raised by the organization, which is run by a group of volunteers and incorporated in South Australia as the non-for-profit organization Desert Challenge Inc.

Race location and routes 

The SDBC" crosses the Munga-Thirri–Simpson Desert National Park (proclaimed a national park on 26  November 2021, formerly Munga-Thirri—Simpson Desert Conservation Park and the Munga-Thirri-Simpson Desert Regional Reserve) a large area of dry, red sandy plain and dunes in the Northern Territory, South Australia and Queensland. The course varies from year to year as several routes have been surveyed and developed.

The SDBC it is basically a moving race village, comprising riders and their support crews, 4 wheel drive vehicles and event crew.

The race routes traverse tracks that were constructed for oil exploration in the 1970s. In wet conditions, track closures are common and the race may need to be diverted.

Race concept and purpose 
There are no settlements or service locations between the SDBC start and finish lines. As the event crosses protected conservation areas, it has to comply with a range of rules designed to protect the environment. The SDBC  follows a format in which riders are always travelling between a front and rear convoy.

Each day, riders complete a morning and afternoon stage.
 Race distance: 
 Race duration: 5 days (9 or 10 stages; on day five there are one or two stages)
 Stage distances: ~ 75 km morning, ~ 45 km afternoon.

Due to the significant daily distances and the requirement for riders to arrive at night camp before dark, the SDBC has a minimum speed requirement. If caught by the “sweep,” riders have to take a lift to the end of that stage. Riders are allowed to restart the next stage in the afternoon or the next morning.

All riders who complete every stage of the SDBC get the “100% SDBC medal.” The average percentage of riders winning the 100% medal is 36% – although there have been years where no rider completed the course (e.g. 2008) as well as one year where no rider was swept at all (2016).

Water stops are located approximately every  and every rider has to stop and collect water. At the start and end of every stage, the weight of each rider is recorded to manage risks related to dehydration. Beyond water stops, riders must be self-sufficient.

Medical teams are present at each water stop to monitor the physical and mental status of the riders.

 Support vehicles must travel in either the front convoy ahead of the riders or in the rear convoy behind the Sweep vehicle. Vehicles experiencing difficulties crossing dunes can expect prompt assistance. Regulations require each vehicle to have UHF radio and a high visibility safety flag.

Event origins 

In 1988, Jack and Mary Mullins organised and directed the first Simpson Desert Cycle Classic In 1988. The event raised money for the Paraquad Association.

The Mullins ran the SDBC  until 1994, when Rod and Loz Townsend took it over.   During those years an association with the Paraplegic Benefit Fund was created as a recipient charity. The Townsends managed the event until  2001.

In 2006 a management committee for the SDBC was elected. This committee established Desert Challenge Inc..

Race results

Event history 
In the early years of the SDBC, riders used non-suspension mountain bikes with skinny tyres.  They were forced to push their bikes over the sand dunes. The route usually ran along the Rig Road and Birdsville Track , now known as the “Classic Route”.

After 2009, many competitors started uses fat bikes. With 4+ inch wide tyres, those bikes made it possible to ride on soft sand and cross even steep dunes without having to push. Today, the event is dominated by fat bikes.

The advance in bike technology allowed SDBC organisers to choose different route options, including the French and WAA lines – which feature more challenging sand dunes than the classic route.

The climatic conditions in the desert vary from year to year. There have been extremely dry and hot years as well as wet years which did create an even more challenging set of circumstances for riders. Due to flooding and well as bush fires, there have also been years where the SDBC had to be held in alternative locations. In 2020, due to the global pandemic of COVID-19, the SDBC was cancelled for the first time.

References 

Sports competitions in the Northern Territory
Cycle races in Australia
Mountain biking in Australia
1987 establishments in Australia
Mountain biking events in Australia